Purten is a municipality in Bavaria in Germany which was the site of a post World War II American sector displaced person camp.

Municipalities in Bavaria